Utilia is a genus of moths in the family Oecophoridae.

Species
Utilia falcata Clarke, 1978
Utilia florinda Clarke, 1978
Utilia hualpensis Parra & Ramos-González, 2019
Utilia luridella (Zeller, 1874)
Utilia ochracea (Zeller, 1874)

References

Oecophorinae
Moth genera